Gweru District is a district in the Midlands Province of Zimbabwe.

Background

Gweru District gets its name from Gweru River which has the city as its source and primary drainage basin.

Maintaining the theme of the midlands Gweru is very diverse.

The name Gweru is a further corruption of the name Gwelo which was a distortion of the  name Ikwelo given by  isiNdebele speakers in the late 19th century. Ikwelo was the district because it was not a spot name but rather a name given to a place along the length of the river in question as written by Colonel Carbutt, of Southern Rhodesia as published by the then Chief Information Officer, Information Services Branch. (Division of Native Affairs, Salisbury September, 1960) in the article Lore and Legend: Southern Rhodesia Place Names.

Gweru District has a population of over 231,675.

It has Shurugwi District to the southeast, Chirumhanzu District to the east, Insiza District southwest, Bubi District to the west, Nkayi District northwest and Kwekwe District north.

Gweru City Climate 

Source:World Meteorological Organization

Gweru Rural

Gweru District is administered by the District Administrator who is an ex-officio of (Gweru City Council and Gweru Rural District Council. for Gweru rural.

Gweru rural district includes Lower Gweru and the greater part of Chiwundura

Gweru Urban

Urban districts are administered by urban councils established in terms of the Zimbabwe Urban Councils Act, Chapter 29.15

Gweru local authority is Gweru Municipality which is literally Gweru City Council.

Like in most urban centers nationwide Gweru City Council is dominated by MDC-T.

2013 - 2018 Term

Source: Zimbabwe Electoral Commission

Gweru mayor for this term was Clr. Hamutendi Kombayi

2008 - 2013 Term

Source: Kubatana Aechive

The mayor was Councilor Desmond Fungayi Mufunde who died on 21 June 2009.

Operations

Gweru District, district number three of the 61 in Zimbabwe has Gweru City the 3rd largest city in Zimbabwe as its capital.

Gweru City is also Midlands provincial capital. It is located 164 km northeast of Bulawayo and 275 km south-west-south of Harare via Mvuma ( A17 Highway ) or 278 km via Kwekwe ( A5 Highway ).

.
Gwer District is home to * Roman Catholic Diocese of Gweru, * Lower Gweru,* Gweru River,* Riverside School,* Ascot Stadium, * Chapungu United, * Nalatale, * Danangombe,* Dabuka, * Chaplin High School,* Thornhill High School, *Sacred Heart College,* Midlands Christian College, * Nashville Secondary School, * Fletcher High School,* Midlands State University,* Gweru Sports Club and * Gweru-Thornhill Air Base to name a few.

References

 
Populated places in Midlands Province